Rübenkamp is a station on the Hamburg-Altona link line and served by the trains of Hamburg S-Bahn lines S1 and S11. The station is also known as Rübenkamp (City Nord), due to its proximity to City Nord. It was opened in 1913 and is located in the Hamburg district of Barmbek-Nord, Germany. Barmbek-Nord is part of the borough of Hamburg-Nord.

History 
The station was opened in 1913. The station building from this time is listed as a cultural heritage since 15 June 1986.

Service 
The lines S1 and S11 of Hamburg S-Bahn call at Rübenkamp station.

Gallery

See also 

 Hamburger Verkehrsverbund (HVV)
 List of Hamburg S-Bahn stations

References

External links 

 Line and route network plans at hvv.de 

Hamburg S-Bahn stations
Buildings and structures in Hamburg-Nord
Railway stations in Germany opened in 1913